Norman Ogilvie Street (10 July 1876 – 10 June 1963) was a rugby union player who represented Australia.

Street, a flanker, was born in Bathurst, NSW and claimed one international rugby cap for Australia. His debut game was against Great Britain, at Brisbane, on 22 July 1899.

References

Australian rugby union players
Australia international rugby union players
1876 births
1963 deaths
Rugby union flankers
Rugby union players from New South Wales